The 1940 Little All-America college football team is composed of college football players from small colleges and universities who were selected by the Associated Press (AP) as the best players at each position. For 1940, the AP selected both a first team and a second team.

First team
B - Dominic Collangelo, Newberry
B - Marv Tommervik, Pacific Lutheran
B - Owen Goodnight, Hardin-Simmons
B - Jack Hunt, Marshall
E - Charles "June" Lingerfelt, Rollins
E - Jack Mulkey, Fresno State
T - Alex Schibanoff, Franklin & Marshall
T - Dave Evans, Muskingum
G - Nick Kerasiotis, St. Ambrose
G - Walter Ptak, Albion
C - Stuart Clarkson, Texas A&I

Second team
B - Bill Glenn, Charleston Teachers
B - Tony Canadeo, Gonzaga
B - Tommy Colella, Canisius
B - Thurmon Jones, Abilene Christian
E - Charles Schuster, Eastern Kentucky Teachers
E - Russell Kaminsky, Springfield Teachers
T - Dick Noe, Colorado Mines
T - Boyce Jones, Mississippi College
G - Melvin Long, Emporia Teachers
G - Herb Morelli, Redlands
C - Joe Coons, Long Island University

See also
 1940 College Football All-America Team

References

Little All-America college football team
Little All-America college football teams